Lower Roddlesworth Reservoir is a reservoir on the River Roddlesworth close to Abbey Village in Lancashire, England.

The reservoir is close to Upper Roddlesworth Reservoir and Rake Brook Reservoir, situated within thick forest. It was constructed in the 1850s by Thomas Hawksley for Liverpool Corporation Waterworks, and together with Rake Brook, was designed to hold compensation water to maintain flows in the rivers, whereas the reservoirs at Lower Rivington, Upper Rivington and Anglezarke held water for the public water supply. Water from the two compensation reservoirs was fed into Anglezarke reservoir by a  channel called The Goit.

It impounded  of water when full. The reservoir was completed in 1857.

Bibliography

References

West Pennine Moors
Drinking water reservoirs in England
Geography of Chorley
Reservoirs in Lancashire